Little May is an Australian folk band. Little May was founded in 2012 in Sydney by singer Hannah Field with guitarists Liz Drummond and Annie Hamilton. The band has taken inspiration from music by The National and alt-J. After various performances in the Sydney area, the band released a self-titled EP in 2014, which they had been working on for two years. In 2015, the duo worked on their debut album in New York City. The album was produced by Aaron Dessner of The National. To support the release of the album, the band went on an extensive tour through Europe, aided by bass keyboard player Mark Harding and drummer Cat Hunter. On 20 June 2015, the band performed in Netherlands on Best Kept Secret in Hilvarenbeek. On 9 October 2015 the album "For the company" was released. Dessner, who appeared on the album on various instruments, was credited on three tracks as a co-writer. A week after the release of the album the band played in Paradiso Amsterdam.

Current members 

 Hannah Field – vocals
 Liz Drummond – guitar and vocals

Previous members 
Annie Hamilton – guitar and vocals (2012–2018)

Live musicians 
 Mark Harding – bass guitar and keyboard
 Cat Hunter – drums and percussion

Discography

Albums

Extended Plays

Certified songs

References

Australian indie rock groups
Australian indie pop groups